Andromeda III is a dwarf spheroidal galaxy about 2.44 million light-years away in the constellation Andromeda. It is part of the Local Group and is a satellite galaxy of the Andromeda Galaxy (M31). The galaxy was discovered by Sidney van den Bergh on photographic plates taken in 1970 and 1971.

Observations of the dwarf galaxy using the WFPC2 in 2002 indicate that the bulk of the galaxy is around three billion years younger than the general population of globular clusters in our own galaxy. However, there are some older stars that are comparable in age to the Milky Way galactic clusters. There is no evidence for younger stars in this dwarf galaxy, suggesting no star formation is occurring. A total of 56 variable stars have been discovered in And III, including 51 RR Lyrae variables.

See also
 List of Andromeda's satellite galaxies

References

External links
 SEDS: Dwarf Spheroidal Galaxy Andromeda III

Dwarf spheroidal galaxies
Local Group
Andromeda Subgroup
Andromeda (constellation)
02121
?